Amparo Arozamena (August 24, 1916 – April 30, 2009) was a Mexican actress of film and television, best known for her character roles in the 1960s. During the same decade, she became most noted for her role of "Doña Chole" in the Telesistema Mexicano sitcom Los Beverly de Peralvillo (1968–1973). Arozamena had been acting since her early teens and had her first feature film released at the age of thirteen.

Biography

Arozamena was born on August 24, 1916, in Mexico City, Mexico. She was the youngest daughter from Eduardo "Nanche" Arozamena (a popular character actor from the variety stage) and his first wife, treble of theatre Clemencia Sánchez Méndez. Many of the family's members had artistic background and successful performing careers.  Although Amparo began her career during her early teens in the silent era, she wasn't well known until she played character roles in comedy films during the 1960s, theater plays and TV shows in the 1970s.

Death
She died on April 30, 2009, aged 92, from a heart attack and old age. After losing her second husband, she lived with her niece, the soap-opera writer and playwright Marisa Garrido Arozamena. At the time of her death, Amparo Arozamena was one of the few surviving silent film actors, having appeared in the 1929 silent movie, La calle del ensueño.

Filmography

 María Elena (1936) 
 La calle del ensueño (1929)
 Almas encontradas (1933)  
 El rayo de Sinaloa (1935) 
 Perfidia (1939) .... Muriel, la cazafortunas
 La justicia de Pancho Villa (1940) 
 The Unknown Policeman (1941) 
 Hasta que llovió en Sayula (1941) 
 ¡Qué verde era mi padre! (1945) 
 Toda una vida (1945) 
 Canas al aire (1949) 
 La hija del penal (1949) 
 The Magician (1949)
 La vorágine (1949) 
 Cuando los padres se quedan solos (1949) .... Lorenza 
 Pecado de ser pobre (1950) 
 Traces of the Past (1950)
 Al son del mambo (1950) 
 Cabaret Shangai (1950) 
 La dama torera (1950) .... Julia
 We Maids (1951)
 Mi mujer no es mía (1951) 
 Baile mi rey (1951) 
 Madre querida (1951) 
 Ahí vienen los gorrones (1953) 
 Quiéreme porque me muero (1953) 
 La sexta carrera (1953) 
 Cantando nace el amor (1954)
 Se solicitan modelos (1954) 
 A Tailored Gentleman (1954)
 Maldita ciudad (1954)  
 Tres bribones (1955)
 El caso de la mujer asesinadita (1955) 
 Cielito lindo (1957) 
 Pobres millonarios (1957) 
 El organillero (1957) 
 Sabrás que te quiero (1958) 
 Maratón de baile (1958) 
 Quiero ser artista (1958) 
 Cuatro copas (1958) 
 Tres desgraciados con suerte (1958) 
 Mi desconocida esposa (1958)
 Nacida para amar (1959) 
 El Sordo (1959) 
 México nunca duerme (1959) 
 La vida de Agustín Lara (1959) .... Criada 
 Las Leandras (1960) .... Manuela Monterubio 
 El dolor de pagar la renta (1960) 
 Dos hijos disobedientes (1960) 
 Sobre el muerto las coronas (1961) 
 Viva Chihuahua (1961) 
 ¡Que padre tan padre! (1961) 
 Destino (1962) Telenovela
 Las Amapolo (1962) 
 Cri Cri el grillito cantor (1963) 
 El amor llegó a Jalisco (1963) 
 México de mis recuerdos (1963) .... Sra. de teatro
 La divina garza (1963) 
 Los parranderos (1963) 
 Ruletero a toda marcha (1964) 
 Dos innocentes mujeriegos (1964) 
 La vida de Pedro Infante (1966) .... Pasajera en autobús 
 Duelo de pasiones (1968) Telenovela .... Chuy
 Mi padrino (1968) 
 Los Beverly de Peralvillo (Serie TV) (1968-1971) .... Doña Chole
 Los Beverly del Peralvillo (1971) .... Doña Chole 
 La cigueña sí es un bicho (1971) 
 Que familia tan cotorra (1971) 
 Chucherías (1972-1974) .... Varios personajes 
 Las hijas de don Laureano (1974)
 Ven conmigo (1975) .... Eulogia 
 Yo y mi mariachi (1975) 
 El Apenitas (1978) 
 El patrullero 777 (1978) 
 Nora la rebelde (1979) .... Beatriz vda. de Pérez
 Cuentos colorados (1980) 
 Angélica (1982) Telenovela 
 En busca del paraíso (1982) Telenovela .... Hortensia 
 Por amor (1982) Telenovela 
 Allá en el rancho de las flores (1983) 
 Mas valiente del mundo (1983) 
 El mexicano feo (1984) 
 Hospital De La Risa (1986) .... Milagros
 Ser charro es ser mexicano (1987) 
 Un paso al más acá (1988) 
 Quisiera ser hombre (1988) .... Chona 
 Cuando llega el amor (1989-1990) Telenovela .... Doña Refugio vda. de Carrillo
 Baila conmigo (1992) Telenovela .... Consuelo
 Pólvora en la piel (1992) 
 Dos hermanos buena onda (1993) 
 Yo hice a Roque III (1993) 
 Buscando el paraíso (1994) Telenovela .... Doña Edna 
 3 comunes y corrientes (1995) 
 Alondra (1995) Telenovela .... Matilde "Maty" Ruiz
 Pobre Niña Rica (1995) Telenovela .... Doña Andrea Múzquiz
 Hasta que los cuernos nos separen (1995) 
 Los Nuevos Beverly (1996) 
 El diario de Daniela (1998) Telenovela .... Amparito 
 Humor es... los comediantes (1999) .... Invitada
 Cuento de Navidad (1999) Mini-telenovela .... Clienta de Melquíades
 DKDA: Sueños de juventud (1999) Telenovela .... Carmelita
 Locura de amor (2000/I) Telenovela .... Doña Tomasa
 Mi Destino Eres Tú (2000) Telenovela .... Chonita
 Amigos X Siempre (2000) Telenovela .... Doña Virginia

References

External links

1916 births
2009 deaths
Mexican child actresses
Mexican telenovela actresses
Mexican television actresses
Mexican film actresses
Mexican vedettes
Actresses from Mexico City
20th-century Mexican actresses
21st-century Mexican actresses